Black Shining Leather is the debut studio album by Norwegian black metal band Carpathian Forest. It was released in 1998 through Avantgarde Music, and re-issued in 2007 by Peaceville Records via digipak format.

It was their only release to feature Lazare on drums, who left the band in the following year and would later join Borknagar.

Track listing

Personnel
Carpathian Forest
 Roger Rasmussen (Nattefrost) — lead vocals, lead guitar, keyboards
 Johnny Krøvel (Nordavind) — backing vocals, background guitar, keyboards, bass guitar
 Lars Are Nedland (Lazare) — drums, percussion

Miscellaneous staff
 Terje Refsnes — production, engineering

References

External links
 Black Shining Leather at AllMusic

Carpathian Forest albums
1998 debut albums
Avantgarde Music albums